Alexandra Ten Hove (born December 23, 1995) is a Canadian sailor in the 49er FX class with partner Mariah Millen.

Career
In 2019, Ten Hove and Mariah Millen competed at the 2019 Pan American Games, finishing in fourth place, and qualified Canada an entry for the event at the 2020 Summer Olympics in Tokyo.

In February 2020, the pair finished in 18th place at the World Championships, their highest placement in the event.

In March 2021, Ten Hove was named to Canada's 2020 Olympic team with her partner Mariah Millen.

References

External links
 
 
 

1995 births
Living people
Canadian female sailors (sport)
Olympic sailors of Canada
Sailors at the 2020 Summer Olympics – 49er FX
Sailors at the 2019 Pan American Games
Sportspeople from Kingston, Ontario